The Roman Catholic Diocese of Rarotonga (Latin: Dioecesis Rarotongana) in the Cook Islands is  a suffragan diocese of the Roman Catholic Archdiocese of Suva in neighbouring Fiji. It was erected as the Prefecture Apostolic of Cook and Manihiki in 1922, elevated to the Vicariate Apostolic of Cook Islands in 1948 and elevated as the Diocese of Rarotonga in 1966.

Bishops
Bernardin Castanié, C.I.M. (1923–1939) 
John David Hubaldus Lehman, C.I.M. (1939–1959) 
Hendrick Joseph Cornelius Maria de Cocq, SS.CC. (1964–1971) 
John Hubert Macey Rodgers, S. M. (1973–1977) 
Denis George Browne (1977–1983) 
Robin Walsh Leamy, S. M. (1984–1996) 
Stuart France O'Connell, S. M. (1996–2011)
Paul Donoghue, S.M. (2011–present)

Education

Primary Schools

Saint Josephs School, Rarotonga
Saint Mary's School, Mauke Island (now closed down)

Secondary (High) School

Nukutere College, Rarotonga

Churches

Catholic Cathedral of Rarotonga (and the Cook Islands)

Saint Joseph's Cathedral is the only Catholic Cathedral in the Cook Islands. The Cathedral is located in Avarua.

Three Catholic churches in Rarotonga also serve the local faithful: St Mary's in Arorangi Village, St Paul's in Titikaveka Village and Sacred Heart in Matavera village.

External links and references

Catholic Church in the Cook Islands
Catholic Church in Niue
Rarotonga
Rarotonga
1922 establishments in Oceania